Secretary of State for Human Rights could mean:

 Secretário Especial dos Direitos Humanos, in Brazil
Secrétaire d'État chargé des Droits de l'Homme, in France